The 1983 Soviet First League was the thirteenth season of the Soviet First League and the 43rd season of the Soviet second tier league competition.

Final standings

Top scorers

Number of teams by union republic

External links
 1983 season. RSSSF

1983
2
Soviet
Soviet